Piritta Maria Katariina Rantanen (born 19 July 1979 in Jämsä) is a Finnish politician currently serving in the Parliament of Finland for the Social Democratic Party of Finland at the Central Finland constituency.

References

1979 births
Living people
People from Jämsä
Social Democratic Party of Finland politicians
Members of the Parliament of Finland (2019–23)
21st-century Finnish women politicians
Women members of the Parliament of Finland